The 2002 Toyota Atlantic Championship season was contested over 12 rounds. The CART Toyota Atlantic Championship Drivers' Champion was Jon Fogarty driving for Dorricott Racing. In this one-make formula all drivers had to utilize Swift chassis and Toyota engines. 20 different teams and 38 different drivers competed.

Calendar

bold indicate pole position

Final points standings

Driver

For every race the points were awarded: 20 points to the winner, 16 for runner-up, 14 for third place, 12 for fourth place, 10 for fifth place, 8 for sixth place, 6 seventh place, winding down to 1 point for 12th place. Lower placed drivers did not award points. Additional points were awarded to the fastest qualifier on Friday (1 point), the fastest qualifier on Saturday (1 point) and to the driver leading the most laps (1 point). Oval races only saw one qualifying.

Note:

Race 7 Michael Valiante had 5 points deduction, because he had shortcutted the course.

Race 7 Rocky Moran Jr. was originally disqualified, but after Race 8 the decision was reverted to a 5 points deduction.

Race 3 and 6 only one additional point - oval races.

Complete Overview

R22=retired, but classified NS=did not start NQ=did not qualify NT=no time set in qualifying (15)=place after practice, but grid position not held free

See also
 2002 CART season
 2002 Indianapolis 500
 2002 Indy Racing League season
 2002 Infiniti Pro Series season

External links
ChampCarStats.com

Atlantic
Atlantic
Atlantic Season, 2002
Atlantic Championship seasons
Atlantic